Lewis Galoob Toys, Inc., was a toy company headquartered in South San Francisco, California. They are perhaps best known for creating Micro Machines, which accounted for 50% of its sales in 1989, and distributing the Game Genie in the United States.

History
Lewis Galoob Toys was founded in 1957 by Lewis Galoob and his wife, Barbara Galoob, as a small distributor of toys and stationery. Galoob's first toy success was the reintroduction of a battery-powered Jolly Chimp, a cymbal-banging monkey toy that nodded his head when activated. The company was incorporated in 1968.

In 1970, Lewis Galoob became too ill to continue as president, and his 21-year-old son, David, dropped out of the University of Southern California to take over the family business. In partnership with his brother, Vice-President Robert Galoob, David aggressively pursued new product development, and transformed the company into a $1 million business by 1976.

The company was greatly affected by the financial collapse of Black Monday in 1987, year in which it lost $25 million, but the following year it recovered by generating a profit of $6 million. By 1988 the company manufactured 85% of its toys in China. 

Galoob was involved in a landmark intellectual property lawsuit, Lewis Galoob Toys, Inc. v. Nintendo of America, Inc., over the Nintendo Entertainment System version of the Game Genie.  Nintendo charged that the Game Genie violated copyright by creating an unlicensed derivative of their copyrighted games. Galoob won the lawsuit and continued to produce the Game Genie.

In September 1998, American toy giant Hasbro purchased Galoob for $220 million. Today, Galoob is a Hasbro brand name. The name began appearing on retail products starting in 2005.  Hasbro has used the Galoob brand logo on its Titanium Series die-cast metal collectibles, including various items from Transformers, Star Wars, and Battlestar Galactica.

Franchises licensed to Galoob for merchandising 
Aliens
The A-Team
Adventures of the Galaxy Rangers (not released in America)
The Animal 4x4
Anastasia (1997 film)
Army G.E.A.R. (toys)
Baby Buddies
Baby Face (toy)
Battle Squads Military Action Fleet
BlackStar
Biker Mice from Mars (1993 series)
Bouncing Babies
Chrysler
Cutie Club
Defenders of the Earth
Dinosaucers (not released in America)
Dozzy Doll
DragonFlyz
Fancy Sounds
Game Genie
Garbage Pail Kids (TV series) (not released)
General Patch (figures packaged as Gen Patch)
Ghostbusters (1984 film)
Go Monkey Go
Golden Girls (toys)
Hollywood's
The Infaceables
Jonny Quest: The Real Adventures
The Last Starfighter (not released)
Lost n' Founds
Magic Diaper
Macro Machines
Micro Machines
Titanium series Micro Machines Transformers (in conjunction with Hasbro)
Mighty Morphin Power Rangers
Mr. Game Show
Married... with Children
Marvel Comics
Men in Black (film)
Mutant League
Peugeot
Peeper Pals
Pound Puppies
Power Machines
Punky Brewster dolls
Razz Blasters
San Francisco Mint Model Gun Club
Sky Dancers
Spice Girls dolls
Starship Troopers (film)
Star Trek V: The Final Frontier
Star Trek: The Next Generation
Star Wars
Super Force (not released)
Sweet Secrets
T. and T. (not released)
Trash Bag Bunch
Terminator 2: Judgment Day
Ultraforce (comics)
Unifighters
World Championship Wrestling
Xpanders
Zbots

References

External links

Galoob.com (Archive)

Toy companies of the United States
Former Hasbro subsidiaries
Manufacturing companies established in 1957
Manufacturing companies disestablished in 1998
South San Francisco, California
Companies based in San Mateo County, California
Doll manufacturing companies
1957 establishments in California
1998 disestablishments in California
1998 mergers and acquisitions